Joel Douglas Jackson is a United States Air Force major general currently dual-hatted as commander of the Air Force District of Washington and 320th Air Expeditionary Wing since July 20, 2021, replacing Maj Gen Ricky Rupp. He previously served as the director of operations, strategic deterrence, and nuclear integration of the Air Mobility Command.

References

External links

Living people
Year of birth missing (living people)
Place of birth missing (living people)
United States Air Force generals